Asan Station is a railway station on the Janghang Line which is also served by Line 1 of the Seoul Subway. Its located in Baebang-eup, Asan-si, Chungcheongnam-do, South Korea. Meanwhile, is served by all Saemaeul-ho and Mugunghwa-ho services on the Janghang Line.

It is connected to (and it is possible to transfer to trains which stop at) Cheonan–Asan station, a KTX railway station which is also served by Gyeongbu KTX and Honam KTX.

History
Asan station was opened on March 30, 2007, to facilitate access to the KTX station.

Station layout

Gallery

References

External links
 Asan station information from Korail

Metro stations in Asan
Metro stations in Cheonan
Seoul Metropolitan Subway stations